New Multitudes is a Woody Guthrie tribute album performed by Jay Farrar, Will Johnson, Anders Parker, and Jim James to commemorate the 100th anniversary of Guthrie's birth, released through Rounder Records on February 28, 2012. The project was initiated by Woody's daughter Nora Guthrie to have Farrar add music to her father's lyrics—specifically, his earliest songwriting years in Los Angeles. Over the course of several years, he invited the others to collaborate and recorded at a variety of locations across the United States. Each artist wrote music to lyrics that inspired him and presented it to the collaborators for recording. The result is an album with diverse musical genres that has garnered positive reviews from critics for its varied styles and instrumentation. The quartet promoted the album with a small promotional tour that took them to record stores, radio programs, theaters, and folk festivals. The group has plans for releasing a second volume.

Development and recording

New Multitudes is one of several tribute albums for American folk singer-songwriter Woody Guthrie. Guthrie died in 1967 after an extended battle with Huntington's disease, but his abbreviated career helped to inspire innumerable musicians during his lifetime as well as in the 1960s folk revival movement. Farrar was initially invited to collaborate with Bragg on the Mermaid Avenue sessions in 1995, but felt uncomfortable working on the material with someone else. Warner Bros. Records wanted all of Son Volt to collaborate with Bragg, but after Farrar declined, he kept the idea in mind. In 2006, he approached Nora Guthrie about returning to her father's lyrics and she agreed.

To write his own batch of songs, Farrar looked through several of the over 3,000 handwritten lyrics that Guthrie's estate has preserved before incidentally focusing on his California period. The connection to Guthrie's Los Angeles years was accidental—Farrar simply chose lyrics that he found compelling and Nora pointed out that they came from a relatively brief period of her father's life when he lived in Los Angeles. He also made a conscious decision to write instrumentation in a style more similar to Guthrie's than other tribute projects, such as The Klezmatics' klezmer-based Woody Guthrie's Happy Joyous Hanukkah and Wonder Wheel. Farrar had never listened to the Bragg and Wilco material to ensure that his songwriting would not be influenced by it.

Immediately before going to the Archives in autumn 2006, Farrar invited his Gob Iron collaborator Anders Parker to come with him and look over potential material and the two returned several times over a period of months gathering lyrics for composition before recording together starting on July 14, 2007. As they found lyrics that interested them, they had reproductions mailed to their homes from the Archives to work on the material at their leisure. The duo finished recording several songs throughout the year but did not have enough material to complete the album. The recordings were also made without a budget or record contract for release.

Nora Guthrie played some of the 2009 recordings for Yames and Farrar invited him to join the duo after discovering that he had visited the Archives as well. Yames wrote the tune for "Hoping Machine" and suggested that fellow Monsters of Folk collaborator Johnson accompany them. Farrar mailed Johnson some lyrics and he composed "Chorine My Sheba Queen" that afternoon, while Yames was attracted to the lyrics of "Empty Bed Blues" while recovering from an injury. Once the entire quartet had composed songs, they entered studios in Brooklyn and East St. Louis throughout 2009 and 2010, recording songs with live vocals in one or two takes, crowding around a single microphone. The group attempted to have the recordings ready for a 2011 release, but had to finish the album too late in the year.

Farrar has characterized the songwriting process for this album as easier than his typical work composing new lyrics as it allowed him to be less self-conscious.

Tour

The quartet toured the United States to support the album, playing all of the groups' Guthrie compositions as well as some solo work. Bobby Bare, Jr. and Sarah Jaffe opened for them. Early in the tour, the group discussed reconvening for further dates, but decided to cap their initial outing with the Newport Folk Festival.

The performers also released a four-track 10" single "Let's Multiply" exclusive for Record Store Day.

Members
Jay Farrar – lead guitar, vocals
Will Johnson – drums, rhythm guitar, vocals
Anders Parker – drums, rhythm guitar, vocals
Yim Yames – bass guitar, vocals

Dates

Additionally, Parker performed some of the New Multitudes material at the initial benefit concert SwitchPoint hosted by IntraHealth International in Saxapahaw, North Carolina on April 20.

Response
The tour was well-received, with The New York Times critic Nate Chinen describing their Webster Hall performance as familiar, but with a unique confluence of styles from each lyricist, from Yames' "hazy magnetism" to Parker's "straightforward folk-rock earnestness." The Philadelphia Inquirers review by Sam Adams praised the performers by concluding that "all four musicians are worthy of following in Guthrie's footsteps, each in his own distinctive way."

Reception

Critical reception

The album has received generally positive reviews from critics. At Metacritic, which assigns a normalized rating out of 100 to reviews from mainstream critics, the album received an average score of 81, based on 13 reviews, which indicates "generally favorable reviews". MusicOMH's Max Raymond has praised the album as being "engrossing" due to the emotional depth of the lyrics as well as the warm and relaxed sound of the studio recording. Will Hermes of Rolling Stone gave the album a mixed review, praising the vocal harmonies. The diversity in sound was highlighted by AbsolutePunk's Gregory Robson, Jason Schneider of Exclaim! and The A.V. Club's Chris Martins, ranging from electric blues to psychedelia as well as the atypical lyrics from Guthrie—focusing on the city of Los Angeles rather than his communist-leaning politics and Dustbowl tragedy narratives. American Songwriters Evan Schlansky noted the same apolitical tone of the lyrics, but qualified that with Yames' delivery on "My Revolutionary Mind". He praised the album's diversity as a strength, allowing each vocalist an opportunity to display his unique talents. Writing for Los Angeles Times, Randy Lewis agrees that the songwriting diversity is a strength, comparing individual tracks with R.E.M., The Velvet Underground, Richard Thompson, and John Mellencamp. Graham Reid of The New Zealand Herald also notes similarities to R.E.M., fellow Guthrie admirer Bob Dylan, The Byrds, and Eagles. The PopMatters review by Jeff Strowe points out the blues influences in the album, adding to its emotional depth. About.com's Kim Ruehl has criticized the diversity and complexity of the album as contrary to the simplicity of Guthrie's actual recordings, concluding that "If this weren't presented so staunchly as being at least part 'Woody Guthrie album,' it might be a little easier to swallow." Doug Collette of All About Jazz also reviewed the deluxe edition bonus disc, comparing it favorably to the proper album as well as the previous Farrar–Parker collaboration Gob Iron. The album topped American publication Billboard's Heatseekers.

Sales chart performance

Track listing
All lyrics written by Woody Guthrie, all lead vocals by co-writer.

"Hoping Machine" (Farrar) – 4:52
"Fly High" (Parker) – 3:45
"My Revolutionary Mind" (Yames) – 4:43
"VD City" (Johnson) – 4:05
"Old L.A." (Parker) – 3:03
"Talking Empty Bed Blues" (Yames) – 4:09
"Chorine My Sheba Queen" (Johnson) – 4:50
"Careless Reckless Love" (Farrar) – 5:01
"Angel's Blues" (Parker) – 4:38
"No Fear" (Johnson) – 3:36
"Changing World" (Yames) – 3:48
"New Multitudes" (Farrar) – 2:47

Limited edition bonus disc
All music written and performed by Farrar and Parker.
"Around New York" – 0:51
"Jake Walk Blues" – 1:59
"Whereabouts Can I Hide" – 2:51
"Old Kokaine" – 3:04
"I Was a Goner" – 3:42
"San Antone Meat House" – 3:59
"Dopefiend Robber" – 4:41
"World's On Fire" – 3:12
"When I Get Home" – 3:51
"Atom Dance" – 2:34
"Your Smile Cured Me" – 2:41

Personnel

Woody Guthrie – artwork, lyrics
Jay Farrar – vocals, guitar, composition, production
Will Johnson – vocals, guitar, saw on "Chorine My Sheba Queen", composition, production
Anders Parker – vocals, guitar, composition, production
Yim Yames – vocals, guitar, bass guitar, composition, production

Technical
John Agnello – mixing
Larissa Collins – art direction, package design
Mike Martin – engineering
Matt Pence – mixing
Kevin Ratterman – mixing
Brad Sarno – mastering
Mark Spencer – mixing
Anna Webber – photography

Additional musicians
Buck Carter
Jimmy Griffin
Creston Lea
Konrad Meissner

See also
Mermaid Avenue (1998)
Man in the Sand (1999)
Mermaid Avenue Vol. II (2000)
Wonder Wheel (2006)
Woody Guthrie's Happy Joyous Hanukkah (2006)
The Works (2008)
Mermaid Avenue: The Complete Sessions (2012)
Lost on the River: The New Basement Tapes (2014), a similar project using Bob Dylan lyrics also featuring Jim James.
Monsters of Folk, another supergroup with Johnson and James

References

External links
Stream of the album from Team Coco
Woody Guthrie 100th anniversary homepage
Press release from Rounder Records
Behind the scenes video

2012 debut albums
Anders Parker albums
Collaborative albums
Concept albums
Folk rock albums by American artists
Jay Farrar albums
Jim James albums
Los Angeles in fiction
Rounder Records albums
Will Johnson (musician) albums
Woody Guthrie tribute albums